Gabrovčec (in older sources also Gabrovščica) is a settlement on the right bank of the Krka River in the Municipality of Ivančna Gorica in central Slovenia. The area is part of the historical region of Lower Carniola. The municipality is now included in the Central Slovenia Statistical Region. 

A small roadside chapel-shrine in the settlement is dedicated to Saint Anthony of Padua and was built in the early 20th century.

References

External links

Gabrovčec on Geopedia

Populated places in the Municipality of Ivančna Gorica